Jordy Tutuarima (born 28 April 1993) is a Dutch professional footballer who plays as a left back for PEC Zwolle in the Eerste Divisie. He formerly played for FC Oss, NEC, Telstar and De Graafschap. He has Indonesian descent from his grandfather who is from Moluccas, Indonesia.

Personal life
His Grandfather is Indonesian of Moluccan descent.

Club career

NEC, Oss and Juliana '31
Born in Velp, Tutuarima started his youth career at local club SC Elistha then moved to the junior team NEC and played in the club for 10 years.
In the 2012–13 season, he was given the opportunity to obtain a contract to acquire and at the end of August, he signed a one-year contract with an option on another season.

In 2012 Tutuarima joined NEC where he met up Navarone Foor, a fellow player of Indonesian descent and a friend since childhood. On 10 October 2012, he made his professional debut in a home game against Heracles Almelo replacing Leroy George in the Eredivisie.

On 30 January 2014, he was loaned to FC Oss. After his contract with NEC ended, Tutuarima moved to amateur club Juliana '31 after having trialled with JVC Cuijk.

Telstar
From the summer of 2015, it was first announced that he would play for JVC Cuijk but he then opted for a move to Koninklijke HFC.

On 6 May 2015, however, it was announced he signed a one-year contract with Telstar, marking his return to professional football.

De Graafschap
On 10 May 2017, Tutuarima signed a two-year contract with De Graafschap with an option of a third season.

Apollon Smyrnis
On 28 June 2021, Greek Super League club Apollon Smyrnis announced Tutuarima had signed a contract with the club, with the duration of the contract and the shirt number not being disclosed.

PEC Zwolle
Tutuarima joined newly relegated Eerste Divisie club PEC Zwolle on 11 June 2022, signing a two-year contract.

International career
Tutuarima was called up to the Netherlands U-17 team. But when the junior competition he got injured torn ligaments and muscle, and made him disappear from football for fifteen months. He only played four times for the Netherlands U-17 team.
he became the Netherlands U-17, tournaments competed four countries: Georgia U-17, Czech Republic U-17 and Ukraine U-17, in March 2010.

In the team he also accompanied by players of Indonesian descent, Levi Raja Boean from NEC, as a substitute.

Tutuarima has represented Netherlands at under-17 level.  is also eligible to represent Indonesia at international level through his family's background.

References

External links
 
 

1993 births
Living people
Indo people
Association football fullbacks
Netherlands youth international footballers
Dutch people of Indonesian descent
Dutch footballers
NEC Nijmegen players
TOP Oss players
Juliana '31 players
SC Telstar players
Apollon Smyrnis F.C. players
PEC Zwolle players
Eerste Divisie players
Eredivisie players
People from Rheden
Footballers from Gelderland
Expatriate footballers in Greece
Dutch expatriate footballers
Dutch expatriate sportspeople in Greece